The 1946–47 Kansas Jayhawks men's basketball team represented the University of Kansas during the 1946–47 college men's basketball season.

Roster
Otto Schnellbacher
Charles B. Black
Ray Evans
Owen Peck
Don Auten
Wendell Clark
Gilbert Stramel
Clifford King
Jack Eskridge
Claude Houchin
William Sapp
Charles Penny
Harold England

Schedule

References

Kansas Jayhawks men's basketball seasons
Kansas
Kansas
Kansas